WAAT may refer to:

 Waat, a village in South Sudan
 WNYM, a Hackensack, New Jersey radio station (970 AM) which held the call sign WAAT in 1922 and from 1926 to 1958
 WXBK, a Newark, New Jersey radio station (94.7 FM) which held the call sign WAAT-FM from 1947 to 1958
 WIMG, a Ewing, New Jersey radio station (1300 AM) which held the call sign WAAT from 1959 to 1971
 WJHT, a Johnstown, Pennsylvania radio station (92.1 FM) which held the call sign WAAT from 1973 to 1976
 WMGM-TV, a Wildwood, New Jersey television station (virtual channel 40, digital channel 36) known as WAAT from 1981 to 1984
 WQOR, an Olyphant, Pennsylvania radio station (750 AM) which held the call sign WAAT from 1998 to 2003
 WMYS-LD,  a South Bend, Indiana television station (virtual channel 69, digital channel 28) known as WAAT-LP from 2004 to 2006